Arcesis is a genus of moths belonging to family Tortricidae.

Species
Arcesis anax Diakonoff, 1983
Arcesis tetracona (Meyrick, 1907)
Arcesis threnodes (Meyrick, 1905)

See also
List of Tortricidae genera

References

External links
Tortricid.net

Olethreutini
Tortricidae genera
Taxa named by Alexey Diakonoff